Viator is a municipality in Spain.

Viator may also refer to:

People
A viator, the initiator of a viatical settlement
Saint Viator (disambiguation), multiple saints
Calventius Viator, Roman soldier (2nd century)
Viator, pen name of John McLean (c. 1799–1890), Scoto-Canadian trader, explorer, and author
Casey Viator (1951–2013), American bodybuilder and journalist
Eddy Viator (born 1982), French footballer
Matt Viator (born 1963), American football coach

Other
Viator (Jack Stauber album), a 2015 album by the American artist
Viator (journal), an academic journal on medieval and early modern literature and history
Viator picis, an extinct lapwing species and genus
Partenavia Viator, alias for the AP68TP-600 "Viator" light aircraft
Viator, a travel brand acquired by TripAdvisor in 2014